There are 26 States of Brazil, or Estados in Portuguese, which are the federal states of Brazil, plus the Federal District which holds the capital city, Brasília. This and the below figures are based on 2022 estimate data, the value for women are 10.02 per 1000 and for men are 11.68 per 1000 people , both combined are 10.85 for 1000.

See also
Brazil
List of Brazilian states by murder rate
List of subnational entities
States of Brazil

References

External links
Statoids data on Brazilian states

Brazil, infant mortality
Infant mortality
Infant mortality